Floras Lake is a natural  body of water on the southern Oregon Coast of the United States. It was probably named for Fred Flora, a 19th-century settler and miner who lived nearby.

The river flows north behind a foredune until veering west and entering the Pacific Ocean through a break in the dune.

Relatively remote, the lake and the  Floras Lake State Natural Area, can be reached on foot from the south along a  trail that begins at Cape Blanco Airport. More common is to approach by car on Floras Lake Road off U.S. Route 101. This leads to Boice–Cope County Park, at the northeastern corner of the lake.

The area near the lake, between Bandon to the north and Cape Blanco to the south, includes many state, federal, and county parks, recreation areas, and wildlife sanctuaries. Among those are the New River Area of Critical Environmental Concern (ACEC), overseen by the Bureau of Land Management north of the lake and west of the county park. The county park, which has campsites and day-use facilities, offers access to the New River ACEC as well as the lake.

Recreation
Sailboarding, especially for beginners because of the lake environment and wind conditions, is popular at Floras Lake.

Boice–Cope County Park provides a boat ramp for sport fishing at the lake, which is stocked with rainbow trout and supports a small population of largemouth bass. It is also part of the migratory route for Chinook salmon and other seagoing fish on their way to and from the lake's feeder streams.

The Floras Lake Trail, one of the four trails in the New River ACEC, connects the county park to the Floras Lake State Natural Area. The beach west of the foredune is part of a  stretch of sand between Bandon and Cape Blanco named part of the Oregon Coast Trail by the Oregon Department of Parks and Recreation.

See also
 List of lakes in Oregon

References

Lakes of Oregon
Lakes of Curry County, Oregon